David Bray  may refer to: 

 David A. Bray, executive leader who served as Chief Information Officer for the Federal Communications Commission
 David Kaonohiokala Bray (1889–1968), kahuna in Hawaii